The family Homolidae, known as carrier crabs or porter crabs, contains 14 genera of marine crabs. They mostly live on the continental slope and continental shelf, and are rarely encountered. Members of the Homolidae have their fifth pereiopods (last pair of walking legs) in a sub-dorsal position, which allows them to hold objects in place over the rear half of the carapace. The objects carried include sponges, black corals and gorgonians, and this behaviour may be a defence mechanism against predators. Some species have been observed carrying living sea urchins in a symbiotic relationship which allows them to benefit from the protection of the urchin's dangerous spikes.

Genera
A total of 14 genera are currently recognised in the family:
Dagnaudus Guinot & Richer de Forges, 1995
Gordonopsis Guinot & Richer de Forges, 1995
Homola Leach, 1816
Homolax Alcock, 1899
Homolochunia Doflein, 1904
Homologenus A. Milne-Edwards, in Henderson, 1888
Homolomannia Ihle, 1912
Ihlopsis Guinot & Richer de Forges, 1995
Lamoha Ng, 1998
Latreillopsis Henderson, 1888
Moloha Barnard, 1947
Paromola Wood-Mason & Alcock, 1891
Paromolopsis Wood-Mason & Alcock, 1891
Yaldwynopsis Guinot & Richer de Forges, 1995

See also

 Homola barbata, in the Atlantic Ocean and Mediterranean Sea
 Paromola cuvieri, in the East Atlantic and Mediterranean Sea

References

Dromiacea